The Foundation for Contemporary Art (FCA) is a Ghanaian visual arts foundation that aims to create an active network of artists and provide a critical forum for the development of contemporary art in Ghana. Based in Accra, the FCA was founded in 2004 by Professor Joe Nkrumah and Australian/Italian artist Virginia Ryan, along with 12 founding members. The FCA office is located in the W.E.B. DuBois Memorial Centre for Pan-African Culture in the Cantonments neighborhood of Accra.

Membership
The Foundation for Contemporary Art currently has circa 100 members — artists, critics, collectors, art enthusiasts — as well as an advisory board and an executive board. The Foundation for Contemporary Art Ghana actively recruits new members and welcomes all practising artists and people interested in contemporary arts.

Objectives
The objectives of the Foundation for Contemporary Art are fourfold:
 Organize exhibitions, seminars, workshops and publications to raise the awareness of and develop critical thinking about contemporary art in Ghana
Establish a resource centre of arts-related texts available for consultation, research and documentation
Create a website to promote contemporary art in Ghana
Establish a public database of artists, arts organizations, art businesses, galleries and others interested in contemporary art in Ghana

References

External links
Official website

Cultural organisations based in Ghana
Arts organizations established in 2004